Delhi Daredevils (DD) are a franchise cricket team based in Delhi, India, which plays in the Indian Premier League (IPL). They are one of the eight teams that will compete in the 2016 Indian Premier League.

Season standings

Match log

Statistics

References

Delhi Capitals seasons
2016 Indian Premier League
IPL-9 Delhi Daredevils Team 2016